Dabaotai station is a station on Fangshan Line of the Beijing Subway, located in Fengtai District at the southern entrance of Beijing World Park. The station was the northern terminus of the line until it was extended one stop to Guogongzhuang on December 31, 2011.

Station Layout 
The station has 2 underground side platforms.

Exits 
There are 4 exits, lettered A, B, C, and D. Exits A and D are accessible.

Gallery

References

External links

Beijing Subway stations in Fengtai District